The Johns Hopkins Medical Journal was a medical journal published by the Johns Hopkins University that ceased publication in 1982. It was established in December 1889 as The Johns Hopkins Hospital Bulletin. It was renamed Bulletin of the Johns Hopkins Hospital in 1924, before obtaining its final title in 1967. The journal is abstracted and indexed in Index Medicus/MEDLINE/PubMed.

Notable articles
The journal published several landmark papers. Examples are:
  First description of what is now known as the Cushing reflex
  First description of what is now known as Cushing's disease

Editors 
The following persons have been editor-in-chief of the journal:

References

External links 
 

Publications established in 1889
English-language journals
General medical journals
1889 establishments in Maryland
Publications disestablished in 1982
Johns Hopkins University Press academic journals
Defunct journals of the United States
1982 disestablishments in Maryland